Ranze may refer to:

Edo Ranze, a 2008 visual novel by QP:flapper
Ranze Eto, a character in the manga series Tokimeki Tonight
Ranze Terade, performer with Japanese girl group AKB48
Ranze Terada, actress known for the Sailor Moon manga series